KRWG (90.7 FM) is a National Public Radio-affiliated station in Las Cruces, New Mexico. In addition to National Public Radio programming, KRWG also broadcasts segments of classical, jazz and Latin jazz.

External links
 KRWG public radio and TV official website

References 

NPR member stations
RWG
Radio stations established in 1983